The 1982–83 Scottish Premier Division season was won by Dundee United, one point ahead of Celtic and Aberdeen. Greenock Morton and Kilmarnock were relegated.

Dundee United clinched the league championship with a 2–1 win in a Dundee derby against Dundee at Dens Park on the final day of the season.

Table

Results

Matches 1–18
During matches 1–18 each team plays every other team twice (home and away).

Matches 19–36
During matches 19–36 each team plays every other team twice (home and away).

References

External links
1982–83 Scottish Premier Division – Statto

Scottish Premier Division seasons
1
Scot